Emotional may refer to:
Emotion
Emotional (Falco album) a 1986 album by Falco
Emotional (K-Ci & JoJo album), a 2002 album K-Ci & JoJo, and the title song
Emotional (Carl Thomas album), a 1999 album by Carl Thomas, and the title song
Emotional (Jeffrey Osborne album)
"Emotional", song by American Juniors from the album American Juniors
"Emotional", song by Casely from the album 1985
"Emotional", song by Charli XCX from the mixtape Number 1 Angel
"Emotional", song by Diana DeGarmo from the album Blue Skies
"Emotional", song by Loverboy from the album Get Lucky
"Emotional", song by Mikaila from the album Mikaila
Term to refer to the youth subculture, usually shortened to emo